WKUZ is an FM radio station broadcasting on a frequency of 95.9 Megahertz.  WKUZ is licensed to the city of Wabash, Indiana and is owned by Upper Wabash Broadcasting Corporation.

The country format of WKUZ is known as 95.9 Kiss FM.

References

External links

KUZ
Country radio stations in the United States